The Labour Party has been active in the Stroud constituency area since at least 1897 and the constituency has been represented in UK Parliament by two Labour MPs, Ben Parkin and David Drew. The Party is currently represented by 14 Councillors on Stroud District Council and three on Gloucestershire County Council. Previous Labour Group leaders have included Steve Lydon, Margaret Nolder, Steve Greenwood. Labour leaders on the predecessor Councils have included Bill Maddox (Stroud RDC) Walter Preston(Stroud UDC) and Tom Langham (Stroud UDC). Tom Langham was the first Labour Chair of Stroud UDC in 1935. On 30 June 2022, Cllr Doina Cornell, the current Leader of Stroud District Council, left the Labour Party following her removal from the long list of Labour candidates for the Stroud Parliamentary constituency. Three other members of the council also left the Labour Party the day after.

Independent Labour Party

The first recorded attempt to promote Socialism in Stroud was a visit of 40 trade unionists and ILP members in June 1895, this was chaired by David Fraser the President of the Gloucester ILP. In July 1897 the “Clarion Van” visited Stroud for four days and meetings were addressed by John Bruce Glasier, Councillor Alpass(from Berkeley), Fenton Macpherson and Mary Macpherson. Glasier and the Macphersons were accommodated by a Mr and Mrs Hunt during their stay in Stroud. A branch of the ILP was formed in the Town in August 1897.
A public meeting organised by the Branch was held on Sunday 16 January 1898 addressed by Pete Curran.  Additional text about the history of ILP in Stroud to be added

Trades and Labour Council
A Trades and Labour Council started in about 1898 (paragraph to be completed)

The Trades Union Congress continues to support a network of locally organised Union Councils and while the Stroud Trades Council came to an end in about 1999 there are 21 Trades Councils in the South West with two covering Gloucestershire—Cheltenham and District Trades Council and Gloucester and District Trades Council .

Trade and Labour Club 
By 1908 the Labour Movement had a Club building on Lower Street Stroud (paragraph to be completed)

Far Hill 
The official opening of the new Headquarters for the Constituency at Far Hill on Cainscross Road took place on 20 September 1930. The building has previously been the depot of the Cotswold Grocery Stores and had been purchased for £1000 with the Club and Institute becoming the headquarters of the Stroud Constituency Labour Party but also the home of trade union branches in the area. Charles Duncan Labour MP for Clay Cross visited the town for the official opening.  The building was sold to Stroud Urban District Council in the early 1970s and demolished and the site was used for a waste tip and council car park but has subsequently been redeveloped for a DIY store. The Current Labour Party offices are based at 5a Lansdown.

Parliamentary candidates
The first time a Labour Candidate contested an election for the Stroud Constituency was in 1918.  Of the 17 individuals who have stood, two were elected for Stroud with four others subsequently elected for other constituencies.

Stroud 1918–1945

1950–1951

1955–2019

Prominent activists

References

Politics of the United Kingdom
Stroud